Kit Carson Park is a  municipal park in Escondido, California, United States. The park was named after Christopher (Kit) Carson, the famous scout who guided Captain John C. Frémont over the Sierra Nevada during a government exploration expedition. A historical monument commemorating the battle is located on Mule Hill, one mile southeast of the park.

History
The City of Escondido acquired the land for its largest regional park from the City of San Diego in 1967.  of the park have been developed, and  have been preserved as natural habitat. The park has been described as the "city's recreation hub" with a "giant recreation complex".A Sports Center opened in 1997 which includes a  skate park, a soccer arena and an arena for inline hockey. Solar panels are being installed at the sports center, as well as near the softball fields, as part of a bigger project to generate energy atop Escondido city facilities.
Escondido Skate Park features wooden ramps rather than concrete, found in typical skate parks. The wooden ramp make the park more flexible when it comes to adding ramps and other features, but also makes it prone to weather damage. The city of Escondido renovated the 22,000-square-foot park in 2009, removing rotted plywood, replacing hardware and waterproofing the new wood. More than 10,000 in-line skaters, skateboarders and BMX riders from age 6 to adult use the park each year.

Queen Califia's Magical Circle, the only American sculpture garden by the internationally acclaimed artist Niki de Saint Phalle, opened in 2003 at the park.

The park has been used as a command post and staging area during wildfires in the area.

Park features

 Walking / hiking trails
 5-acre arboretum: The Iris Sankey Magical Garden
 3 ponds: Tree Lake, Duck Lake, and Sand Lake
 Tot lot / playground
 Shaded picnic areas with tables / barbecues
 Covered picnic shelter
 Open turf areas
 Lighted youth baseball and softball fields
 Lighted adult softball fields
 Lighted soccer fields
 Lighted tennis courts
 3,000 capacity outdoor amphitheater
 Queen Califia's Magical Circle sculpture garden
 Eucalyptus Leaf Court public art piece
 Sports Center complex with pro shop
 22,000 square-foot skate park
 2 full-size covered roller hockey arenas
 1 full-size soccer arena
 1 "mini" soccer arena
 Girl Scouts of the USA Program Center, located at the north end of the park
 Disc Golf course

Location
The park's entrance is located five minutes from I-15 (via Rancho Parkway Exit) at the corner of Bear Valley Parkway and Mary Lane, and opposite from San Pasqual High School.

See also
 Urban wild
 Urban park

References

Municipal parks in California
Urban public parks
Escondido, California
Protected areas established in 1967
1967 establishments in California
Parks in San Diego County, California